Bruce M. Snell (March 4, 1895 – September 23, 1976) was a justice of the Iowa Supreme Court from January 1, 1961, to March 4, 1970, appointed from Ida County, Iowa.

His son, Bruce M. Snell Jr., also served on the Iowa Supreme Court.

References

Justices of the Iowa Supreme Court
1895 births
1976 deaths
20th-century American judges